Windy is the debut extended play by South Korean rapper and record producer Soyeon. It was released digitally on July 5, 2021, and physically on July 6, 2021, through Cube Entertainment and Republic Records. Windy consists of five tracks, including the lead single "Beam Beam". The album introduces Soyeon's alter ego Windy, who explores her current and dream 20's.

Background
On May 21, 2021, it was reported that Soyeon would be releasing a solo album after 4 years. In an interview with Vogue Korea for the July edition, Soyeon expressed the difference between Windy and her group's albums, "(G)I-dle is meaningful in itself, but I couldn't show everything I wanted to do. I made music that suits (G)I-dle, and the music that fans want. Even before my debut, the music I wanted to do on my own was piled up. I picked it up and put it in this album." To Soyeon, Windy is her other self, describing her as "a friend who is as free as the wind and doesn't care about others."

Artwork and packaging
The Windy package design is reminiscent of a fast food takeout box. It features a cartoon character, which is a parody of the Wendy's mascot, carrying a flag with a hamburger on it. The EP comes with a booklet, CD, CD package, lyric paper, postcard, photo card, mini photo stand, membership card, sticker, coaster and poster which is only available for pre-order.

Composition
Windy is an album released from the perspective of Soyeon's alter ego, a free soul like the wind, which contains songs of various genres and unique concepts. The opening song "Beam Beam" is a pop rock and hip hop song expressing the sun's rays, heralding the birth of an all-time summer song. "Weather" was a previously unreleased song that fans have been waiting for, first hinted on KakaoTV's  where she made an appearance on the show. "Quit" has been described as a song that anyone can enjoy comfortably, while "Psycho" is a song with impressive beats. The last track, "Is This Bad B****** Number?", featuring Bibi and winner of High School Rapper 3 Lee Young-ji, is a song that shows the chemistry of Generation Z, described in a press release.

Promotion
On June 17, Cube released an artwork teaser containing a character wearing a chef's hat and a hamburger flag as an illustration with a yellow background and mint colour fonts and the phrase 'Grand Open 2021.07.05 18:00 (KST)'. On June 21, a concept teaser video with background music titled "Windy Burger" composed and written by Soyeon was released. The following day, a promotional schedule for the album was released through her official group homepage and social media. Soyeon then released Blooming Windy Day 1 and Day 2, documentary videos featuring her family, co-workers, producers, staff member, childhood friends, showing off her daily life and work as an "artist idol" with composing, writing and producing skills, and the contents of her first mini-album Windy. On June 28 and 29, Soyeon released four concept images showing her chameleon-like side hip image in kitsch fashion with intense eyes and a provocative expression, fatal and chic image. An album preview with snippets of the EP's tracks was uploaded on July 1. Two music video teasers for the title track, "Beam Beam", have been posted before its release on July 3 and 4.

To commemorate the release of the album, the global entertainment platform Makestar and Dearmymuse opened the one-on-one video call event page.

Track listing
The following tracklist was adapted from the official released track list image.

Charts

Release history

References

External links

2021 EPs
Cube Entertainment EPs
Korean-language EPs
Universal Music Group EPs
Kakao M EPs
Republic Records EPs
Albums produced by Jeon So-yeon